Elegia is a genus of grass-like plants in the family Restionaceae endemic to Cape Province in South Africa. Some species are grown as ornamentals in gardens.

It was first described as a genus by Linnaeus in 1771. 

Species

References

External links

 
Endemic flora of South Africa
Flora of the Cape Provinces
Fynbos
Poales genera
Taxa named by Carl Linnaeus